Spencer Horatio Walpole  (11 September 1806 – 22 May 1898) was a British Conservative Party politician who served three times as Home Secretary in the administrations of Lord Derby.

Background and education
Walpole was the second son of Thomas Walpole and Lady Margaret Perceval, youngest daughter of the 2nd Earl of Egmont and sister of Prime Minister Spencer Perceval. His  grandfather was Thomas Walpole, son of the diplomat the 1st Baron Walpole, younger brother of Prime Minister the 1st Earl of Orford. Walpole was educated at Eton and Trinity College, Cambridge. He chose law as his profession, and was called to the Bar, Lincoln's Inn, in 1831. He built up a successful practice and was made a Queen's Counsel in 1846.

Political career
Walpole then turned to politics, and in 1846 he was elected to Parliament for Midhurst as a Tory, a seat he would hold until 1856. He quickly gained a reputation in the House of Commons, and when the Tories came to power in early 1852 under Lord Derby, Walpole was appointed Home Secretary in the so-called "Who? Who? Ministry". He was admitted to the Privy Council at the same time. However, the government fell in December 1852.

In 1856 Walpole was elected to Parliament for Cambridge University. Two years later the Tories (or the Conservatives as they became known during the 1850s) returned to office under Lord Derby. Walpole was again appointed Home Secretary, but resigned in January 1859 after disagreements over electoral reforms. The government was dismissed in July the same year. The Conservatives remained out of office for seven years, but in 1866 they again came to power under Derby, who made Walpole Home Secretary for the third time. However, he was severely criticized for his handling of the movement for parliamentary reform, and resigned in May 1867. He nonetheless continued to serve in the cabinet as Minister without Portfolio until February 1868, when Benjamin Disraeli became Prime Minister. Walpole never held office again, but remained a Member of Parliament (MP) for Cambridge University until 1882.

Family
Walpole married his first cousin, Isabella Perceval, daughter of Spencer Perceval, in 1835. They had four children, two sons and two daughters. Their elder son Sir Spencer Walpole was a well-known historian. Walpole died in May 1898, aged 91.

See also
Baron Walpole and Walpole of Wolterton

Notes

References

External links 

 

1806 births
1898 deaths
British Secretaries of State
Presidents of the Cambridge Union
Members of the Parliament of the United Kingdom for English constituencies
Members of the Parliament of the United Kingdom for the University of Cambridge
Fellows of the Royal Society
People educated at Eton College
Alumni of Trinity College, Cambridge
Members of the Privy Council of the United Kingdom
UK MPs 1841–1847
UK MPs 1847–1852
UK MPs 1852–1857
UK MPs 1857–1859
UK MPs 1859–1865
UK MPs 1865–1868
UK MPs 1868–1874
UK MPs 1874–1880
UK MPs 1880–1885
Spencer
Church Estates Commissioners